The Chicago Swans is a United States Australian Football League team, based in Chicago, United States. It was founded in 1998 and is affiliated with the Sydney Swans. They play in the Mid American Australian Football League.

See also

References

External links
 

Australian rules football clubs in the United States
Swans
Australian rules football clubs established in 1998
1998 establishments in Illinois